Dariusz Jan Kubicki (born 6 June 1963) is a Polish football manager and a former player.

Playing career
He played for a few clubs, including Stal Mielec, Legia Warsaw, he then went to England and played for Aston Villa, Sunderland, Wolverhampton Wanderers, Tranmere Rovers, Carlisle United and Darlington.

He played little part in the Aston Villa teams which came second in their 1992-93 Premier League season and won the 1994 Football League Cup, but played a more active part in Sunderland's promotion to the Premier League in 1996. Kubicki was controversially dropped from the team by manager Peter Reid for a game against Derby County when selecting Kubicki would have meant him overtaking the club record for consecutive appearances in the post-war period, still held by George Mulhall.

He played 46 times for the Poland national team, scoring once, and was a participant at the 1986 FIFA World Cup.

Managerial career
Kubicki later began a coaching career and coached Legia Warsaw and Polonia Warsaw.

Kubicki became a coach of Polish second division team Lechia Gdańsk in 2007. In October 2007, Kubicki was arrested by the police due to a bribery scandal involving the sale of one of the Warsaw sport centers. Due to this scandal, Kubicki was suspended as coach of Lechia Gdańsk.

Personal life
Dariusz Kubicki is the father of Patryk Kubicki.

Honours
Sunderland
 Football League First Division: 1995–96

Individual
 PFA Team of the Year: 1995–96 First Division

References

External links
 

1963 births
Living people
Sportspeople from Lubusz Voivodeship
Polish footballers
Association football fullbacks
Poland international footballers
Premier League players
English Football League players
1986 FIFA World Cup players
Stal Mielec players
Legia Warsaw players
Aston Villa F.C. players
Sunderland A.F.C. players
Wolverhampton Wanderers F.C. players
Tranmere Rovers F.C. players
Carlisle United F.C. players
Darlington F.C. players
Polish football managers
Legia Warsaw managers
Lechia Gdańsk managers
Polonia Warsaw managers
Ząbkovia Ząbki managers
FC Sibir Novosibirsk managers
Znicz Pruszków managers
Olimpia Grudziądz managers
Polish expatriate footballers
Polish expatriate sportspeople in England
Expatriate footballers in England
Polish expatriate sportspeople in Russia
Expatriate football managers in Russia
People from Kożuchów